Jacob Bailey Moore (31 October 1797 – 1 September 1853) was an American journalist, printer, newspaper editor and historical writer.

Ancestors

His ancestors emigrated to the United States from Scotland. His father, who had the same name, was a physician (born in Georgetown, Maine, 5 September 1772; died in Andover, New Hampshire, 10 January 1813). His father studied medicine, settled in Andover in 1796, and practised successfully till 1812, when he was appointed surgeon's mate in the U.S. Army. His father wrote verses and numerous newspaper articles, and composed several pieces of music that were published in Samuel Holyoke's Columbian Repository.

Biography
Moore was born in Andover, New Hampshire. He became an apprentice under Isaac Hill  and learned the printer's trade at Concord, and soon became partners publishing the New Hampshire Patriot. Later he engaged in editorial work and edited the New Hampshire Journal from 1826 to 1829, when he was elected sheriff of Merrimack County.  He was a member of the Legislature in 1828.  In 1839 he moved to New York and edited the Daily Whig.  He was a clerk employed by the United States Post Office in Washington, D.C., 1841–1845, but returned to New York and served as librarian of the Historical Society from 1845 to 1849. From 1849 to 1853 he was postmaster of San Francisco.

Family
His sons George Henry, an author and librarian, and Frank, a journalist, also lived in New York. His brother Henry Eaton Moore was a composer, and another brother, John Weeks Moore, edited musical publications.

Publications
Collections Historical, Topographical, Historical, and Biographical, relating principally to New Hampshire, with John Farmer (three volumes, Concord, 1822–1824) This was one first publications devoted to local history in the United States. 
Gazetteer of the State of New Hampshire, with John Farmer (1823)  
Annals of Concord, with a Memoir of the Penacook Indians, John Farmer wrote the Penacook memoir (1823-1826)  
Laws of Trade in the United States (1840)
Lives of the Governors of New Plymouth and Massachusetts Bay (1846)

Honors and memberships
Elected a member of the American Antiquarian Society in 1821.

Notes

Sources

External links

The Peter Force Library at the Library of Congress includes important compilations of pamphlets that were assembled by Jacob Bailey Moore.

Moore Jacob Bailey
Moore Jacob Bailey
Writers from San Francisco
Writers from New York City
American non-fiction writers
American librarians
19th-century American historians
19th-century American newspaper editors
1797 births
1853 deaths
Members of the New Hampshire General Court
American male journalists
Journalists from California
19th-century American male writers
People from Georgetown, Maine
People from Andover, New Hampshire
Historians from New York (state)
19th-century American politicians
Historians from California
Editors of New York (state) newspapers